Joseph Lorenzo Lionel Boileau (May 18, 1904 – June 9, 1969), known as René Boileau, was a Canadian professional ice hockey player who played seven games in the National Hockey League (NHL) for the New York Americans during the 1925–26 season, and five seasons in various minor-professional leagues. As a publicity stunt, the Americans billed Boileau, a French Canadian, as "the first Native American in the NHL" and claimed his name was Rainy Drinkwater. René was the father of the former NHL hockey player, Marc Boileau.

Playing career
Boileau, a  native of Pointe-Claire, Quebec, played his only season in the NHL in 1925–26. Prior to joining the Americans, he played three seasons of amateur hockey in Montreal. Americans manager Tommy Duggan was anxious to promote the first-year Americans and upon signing Boileau used him as part of a publicity stunt. The Americans official announcement on the signing promoted Boileau under the pseudonym "Rainy Drinkwater" and announced that the French-Canadian player was instead from the Caughnawaga Indian Reservation, and the first Native American to play in the NHL. The Canadian press took note of the promotion; former Toronto Star sports editor Milt Dunnell said that "He received more ink than Sitting Bull". He played only seven games with the Americans, scoring no points.

Boileau spent the next five seasons playing professional hockey with the Niagara Falls Cataracts of the  Canadian Professional Hockey League, New Haven Eagles of the Canadian American Hockey League and St. Louis Flyers of the American Hockey Association.   He then played two seasons of semi-professional hockey in Quebec teams before retiring in 1934.  His son, Marc, played and coached in the NHL.

Career statistics

Regular season and playoffs

References

External links
 

1904 births
1969 deaths
Canadian ice hockey centres
Ice hockey people from Quebec
New Haven Eagles players
New York Americans players
Niagara Falls Cataracts players
People from Pointe-Claire
St. Louis Flyers (AHA) players